The Great War and the Shaping of the 20th Century is a 1996 documentary series that aired on PBS. It chronicles World War I over eight episodes. It was narrated by Salome Jens. In the UK, the programme was renamed 1914-18 and was narrated by Dame Judi Dench.

The series won two Primetime Emmy Awards: one for Jeremy Irons for Outstanding Voice-Over Performance, the other for Outstanding Informational Series. It was funded in part by the National Endowment for the Humanities. In 1997, it was given a Peabody Award.

Production 
The documentary series was produced by KCET/Los Angeles along with the BBC and the Imperial War Museum in London. It took five years to make and cost five million dollars. Blaine Baggett was the executive producer and Jay Winter was the chief historian. It aired in the United States on PBS in November 1996.

In contrast to the 1964 BBC production titled The Great War, which focused primarily on the military and political aspects of the war, this 1996 documentary, in keeping with more recent trends in historiography, used a wide variety of types of sources to cover social, cultural, economic and personal perspectives on the war in addition to the military and political.

Voice cast 
 Jürgen Prochnow as Kaiser Wilhelm II
 Martin Landau as Woodrow Wilson
 Malcolm McDowell as Charles Stockwell
 Ian Richardson as David Lloyd George
 René Auberjonois as Jean Jaurès
 Paul Mercurio as Cyril Lawrence
 Liam Neeson as Adolf Hitler
 Ralph Fiennes as Wilfred Owen
 Michael York as Harold Owen
 Jeremy Irons as Siegfried Sassoon
 Natasha Richardson as Vera Brittain
 Louis Gossett Jr. as W. E. B. Du Bois
 Jane Leeves as Caroline Webb
 Marion Ross as Käthe Kollwitz
 Nastassja Kinski as Rosa Luxemburg
 Martin Sheen as Frank Golder
 Udo Kier as Armin T. Wegner
 Yaphet Kotto as Kaphe Kamar
 Ned Beatty as Herbert Hoover
 Timothy Bottoms as Silver Parrish
 Helen Mirren as Margaret Randa
 Rupert Graves 
 Elya Baskin as Yakov Yurovsky
 Leslie Caron as Czarina Aleksandra Romanov

Episodes 
 "Explosion" – Covers the causes of the war, focusing on international tensions resulting from rapid economic, technological, and social changes, as well as how the assassination of Archduke Franz Ferdinand of Austria sparked a continent-wide war. 
 "Stalemate" – Covers the German army’s initial advance through Belgium and France which was stopped at the Battle of the Marne and quickly followed by the armies digging extensive systems of trenches. 
 "Total War" – Examines how the war spread geographically and extended beyond the front lines to civilian populations, including the Turkish massacre of Armenian civilians. 
 "Slaughter" – Focuses on the battles at Verdun, the Somme, and Passchendaele. 
 "Mutiny" – Examines the growing despair on all sides, culminating in revolution in Russia and a mutiny among a large portion of the French army. 
 "Collapse" – Covers the German army’s failed offensive in spring 1918 attempting to end the war before the United States army arrived in large numbers, and the resulting collapse of the German government. 
 "Hatred and Hunger" – Covers the continuing blockade on Germany as the Allies drew up the Treaty of Versailles, with considerable focus on Woodrow Wilson’s role in the Paris Peace Conference. 
 "War Without End" – Examines the cost of the war and its continuing reverberations through the rest of the 20th century.

Awards 
The documentary was a critical success and received several awards:
 Two Emmy Awards 
 Alfred Du Pont Journalism Award
 George Fopster Peabody Award
 Producers Guild of American Vision Award
 International Documentary Association: Best Limited Series Award

Book 
A book of the same title, by Blaine Baggett and Jay Winter, was released along with the broadcast of the television series in 1996. Like the television series, the book covers social, cultural, economic and other issues in addition to the political and military aspects of the war. Though the book is a companion to the television series, it is written to stand on its own as a history of the war.

References

External links 
 PBS website for the series

Peabody Award-winning television programs
1996 American television series debuts
1996 American television series endings
1996 British television series debuts
1996 British television series endings
1990s British documentary television series
Documentary television series about World War I
English-language television shows
1990s American documentary television series
BBC television documentaries about history during the 20th Century